Meditation room may refer to:
 Chamber of Reflection, a Masonic room of isolation and meditation
 Gompa, a Buddhist fortress of learning
 Meditation centre, a location where meditation is practised
 Multifaith space, a room set aside for prayer of any faith
 Quiet room, a room in an office which has sound dampening for isolatation

See also 
 Meditation